Olevano sul Tusciano is a town and comune in the province of Salerno in the Campania region of south-western Italy.

Main sights  
Roman villa of S. Maria a Corte
Castrum Olibani, a Lombard castle. During the rule of Frederick of Hohenstaufen in southern Italy, it was a seat of Hermann von Salza
 Pope gardens in Salitto 
 St. Vincenzo prison
 Convent of Santa Maria di Costantinopoli, a Dominican 16th century building
Curtis di Santa Maria a Corte 
 Church of S. Maria a Corte (1600)
 Church of San Leone Magno (1700)
 Church of Santa Lucia (1700)
 Coven of Santa Regina in Monticello village (1470)
 Chapel of Santa Maria delle Grazie in Monticelli (1746) 
 Coven of San Giacomo in Ariano (1400) 
 Chapel of San Rocco (remains) near Tusciano river.
 Chapel of Madonna della Neve (1500).
 Coven of Santa Maria del Soccorso in Salitto (1515).
 Chapel of Maria Santissima del Rosario in Salitto (968).
 Chapel of Madonna delle Grazie in Salitto (1500).
Grotta di Nardantuono: part of St. Michael's cave. Legend has it that the cave was the shelter of Nardantuono bands of brigands led by Antonio di Nardo, the robber Nardantuono century.

Twin towns 
  Wilmington, United States

References

Cities and towns in Campania